"stay" is Fayray's 12th single. It was released on May 9, 2002 and peaked at #24. The song was used in a commercial for Kanebo's "KATE" cosmetics line and also served as ending theme for the TV Asahi program "Matthew's Best Hit TV". The coupling is a cover of Leon Russell's "A Song for You".

Track listing
stay
a song for you

Charts 
"stay" - Oricon Sales Chart (Japan)

External links
FAYRAY OFFICIAL SITE

2002 singles
Fayray songs
Songs written by Fayray
Avex Trax singles
2002 songs